Dhrishtadyumna is the son of Drupada—the king of the Panchala kingdom—and the twin brother of Draupadi in the Hindu epic Mahabharata.

Dhrishtadyumna is born from a yajna (fire-sacrifice) organised by Drupada, who wanted a son capable of killing his enemy, Drona. When the Pandava prince Arjuna—disguised as a Brahmin—won the hand of Draupadi in marriage, Dhrishtadyumna realises his identity. In the Kurukshetra War, Dhrishtadyumna joins the Pandavas, and becomes the supreme commander-in-chief of the Pandava forces. On the fifteenth day of the war, he beheads Drona, fulfilling the mission of his birth.

Legend

Birth 
left|thumb|A Mughal painting by Bilal Habsi depicting the birth of Dhrishtadyumna. A folio of Razmnama, the Persian translation of the epic
Dhishtadyumna, along with Draupadi, is described as an "ayonija", one not born from a woman's womb. His birth is narrated in the Adi Parva of the epic. According to the legend, Drupada once humiliated his childhood friend Drona because of his poor financial condition, and this led to hatred between them. Drona then became the teacher of the Pandava brothers and they defeated and captured Drupada. Though Drona spared Drupada's life because of their past friendship, he forcefully took half of Panchala. Humiliated by his defeat, Drupada wanted vengeance but since none of his children and allies was powerful enough to defeat Drona, he decided to perform a yajna (fire-sacrifice) to obtain a powerful son.

Drupada appointed the sages Upyaja and Yaja as the head-priests and the yajna was conducted. After it was completed, the sages instructed the queen of Drupada to consume the offering to have a son. However, the queen had scented saffron in her mouth and asked them to wait till she had a bath and washed her mouth. Unable to wait, the sages poured the offering into the sacrificial altar, from which, a youth emerged. He was of fiery complexion and wore a crown on his head, an armour on his body, and carried a sword, a bow as well as some arrows in his hands. He then went to a chariot and the people of Panchala rejoiced after seeing him. Soon after his birth, a divine voice prophesied:

This was followed by the emergence of a beautiful maiden from the fire. The sages named the youth Dhrishtadyumna, and the maiden was named Krishnaa, better known by her patronymic name, Draupadi.

After some time, Drona heard about Dhrishtadyumna and invited him to his kingdom. Even though Drona knew about Dhrishtadyumna's prophecy, he happily accepted him as a student, and taught him advanced military arts, making him a very powerful warrior, and highly knowledgeable about celestial weapons. Dhrishtadyumna became a maharathi under the tutelage of Drona.

Draupadi's Svayamvara 

Dhrishtadyumna hosted his sister Draupadi's svayamvara and told its rules to the kings and princes. When a young Brahmin won Draupadi in front of all the princes and nobility, Dhrishtadyumna secretly followed the Brahmin and his sister, only to discover that the Brahmin was in fact Arjuna, one of the five Pandava brothers.

Marriage and children 
Dhrishtadyumna had multiple wives. He had four sons - Kshatradharman, Kshatravarman, Kshatranjaya, and Dhrishtaketu. The first three were killed in the Kurukshetra War by Drona, whereas Dhrishtaketu was killed by Karna.

Kurukshetra War 
Dhristadyumna was appointed as the Senapati (commander-in-chief) of the Pandava Army in the Kurukshetra War against the Kauravas. He maintained his position till the end of the war. On the 15th day of the war, Drona killed Drupada. The Pandavas conceived a plot to capitalise on Drona's only weakness, his son Ashwatthama. The Pandava Bhima killed an elephant named Ashwatthama. The Pandavas spread the rumour of Ashwatthama's death. Hearing the terrible news, Drona approached the eldest Pandava Yudhishthira in disbelief, who confirmed that Ashwatthama had been killed, but murmured that it had been the elephant named Ashwatthama; the latter part of his reply was overshadowed by conches of Pandava warriors. Thinking his son had died, Drona was shocked and heartbroken, he surrendered his weapons and sat down. Drona started to meditate, and his soul left his body in quest of Ashwatthama's soul. Dhristadyumna, taking advantage of the situation, took his sword and decapitated Drona, killing him.

Death 
On the 18th night of the war, Ashwatthama attacked the Pandava camp during the night, and killed Dhristadyumna. As Dhristadyumna begs for an honourable death, asking to die with a sword in his hand, Ashwatthama ignores him, proceeding to beat and smother him to death rather than beheading him.

Analysis
In one of the many side-stories of the Mahabharata, there is a drama centred around the fact that Dhrishtadyumna, despite not being Drupada's eldest, is his heir. While Drupada and others give many reasons for this, it is implied that the real reason is that Dhristadyumna has a godly parent, and thus more coveted as a ruler since his rule would seem more blessed. Dhristadyumna somewhat internalizes this, looking down upon Satyajit's pacifism, and Shikhandi's single-minded hatred of Bhishma.

References

External links

 

Characters in the Mahabharata